The 2nd IPC Ice Sledge Hockey European Championships was held between November 18, 2007 and November 24, 2007 at Palaghiaccio Ice Rink in Pinerolo, Turin, Italy. Participating 100 athletes from seven nations: Czech Republic, Estonia, Germany, Norway, Italy, Poland, Sweden. The Ice Sledge Hockey European Championships tournament was organised under the aegis of the EPC and the IPC by a Committee made up of Turin Olympic Park, operators of the Palaghiaccio, the Municipality of Pinerolo and the Alioth Sports Society, affiliated to the C.I.P. under its president Paolo Covato (Mayor of Pinerolo) and vice president Tiziana Nasi (President of the C.I.P. Piedmont).

Final rankings

Tournament

Tournament summary 

Schedule
All times are local (UTC+2)

See also
 Ice sledge hockey
 Ice hockey#Sledge hockey
 Ice sledge hockey at the 2006 Winter Paralympics
 2004 IPC Ice Sledge Hockey World Championships
 2008 IPC Ice Sledge Hockey World Championships

External links
 Results
 Venue place Pinerolo The Corso Tazzoli Palaghiaccio ice rink
 The Autonomy Programme takes part in the Ice Sledge Hockey European Championships trophy

IPC Ice Sledge Hockey European Championships
2007
Sledge
IPC Ice Sledge Hockey European Championships
IPC Ice Sledge Hockey European Championships